Sakhavu (Malayalam "comrade") may refer to:
Sakhavu (1986 film)
Sakhavu (2017 film)